Janata Bank Tower is a high-rise office building located in Dhaka, Bangladesh. It is located in Motijheel, the central business district of the metropolis. It houses the headquarters of Janata Bank, the premier financial institution of the country. Bangladesh Bank Building is one of the earliest high-rises that the city constructed. Built in 1985, it is one of the tallest buildings in Bangladesh. Currently, it is the nation's 37th tallest building. This 24-storey Head office building of Janata Bank at Motijheel was built by Concord Group.

See also
 List of tallest buildings in Dhaka

References

Buildings and structures in Dhaka
Skyscraper office buildings in Bangladesh
Motijheel Thana
Office buildings completed in 1985
Bank buildings in Bangladesh